Alphonsea kingii is a species of plant in the Annonaceae family. It is endemic to Peninsular Malaysia. It is threatened by habitat loss.

References

kingii
Endemic flora of Peninsular Malaysia
Critically endangered plants
Taxonomy articles created by Polbot
Taxa named by James Sinclair (botanist)